is a retired Japanese judoka.

Makabe was born in Shōō, Okayama, and began judo at the age of a 2nd grader. She entered the Sumitomo Marine & Fire Insurance after graduating from high-school in 1993.

In 1998, she participated in the Asian Games held in Bangkok and won a gold medal. In 1999, she also participated in the Asian Championships held in Wenzhou.

Makabe retired when she was defeated by Kayo Kitada due to her misjudgment at the semi-final of All-Japan Selected Championships in 2003.

As of 2010, Makabe coaches judo at Mitsui Sumitomo Insurance Group judo club which she belonged to once.

Achievements
1992 - All-Japan High School Championships (-48 kg) 1st
1994 - All-Japan Businessgroup Championships (-48 kg) 3rd
1995 - All-Japan Businessgroup Championships (-48 kg) 2nd
1996 - All-Japan Selected Championships (-48 kg) 3rd
 - All-Japan Businessgroup Championships (-48 kg) 1st
1997 - All-Japan Selected Championships (-48 kg) 3rd
 - All-Japan Businessgroup Championships (-48 kg) 1st
1998 - Asian Games (-48 kg) 1st
 - All-Japan Selected Championships (-48 kg) 2nd
1999 - Asian Championships (-48 kg) 2nd
 - Fukuoka International Women's Championships (-48 kg) 2nd
 - Fukuoka International Women's Championships (-48 kg) 3rd
 - All-Japan Selected Championships (-48 kg) 3rd
 - All-Japan Businessgroup Championships (-48 kg) 1st
2000 - All-Japan Businessgroup Championships (-48 kg) 1st
2001 - Fukuoka International Women's Championships (-48 kg) 2nd
 - All-Japan Selected Championships (-48 kg) 3rd
2002 - Fukuoka International Women's Championships (-48 kg) 3rd
 - All-Japan Selected Championships (-48 kg) 1st
2003 - All-Japan Selected Championships (-48 kg) 3rd

References

Japanese female judoka
People from Okayama Prefecture
1974 births
Living people
Asian Games medalists in judo
Judoka at the 1998 Asian Games
Asian Games gold medalists for Japan
Medalists at the 1998 Asian Games
20th-century Japanese women
21st-century Japanese women